The 2018–19 Long Beach State 49ers men's basketball team represented California State University, Long Beach in the 2018–19 NCAA Division I men's basketball season. The 49ers, led by twelfth-year head coach Dan Monson, competed in the Walter Pyramid. Long Beach State was a member of the Big West Conference, and participated in their 50th consecutive season in that league.

Before the season

The 49ers finished the season 15–18 overall, and 9–7 in the conference. During the season, the 49ers participated in the AdvoCare Invitational, which was held in Morgantown, West Virginia and Lake Buena Vista, Florida. Long Beach State earned 6th place by defeating Oregon State and losing to Missouri as well as Nebraska. Prior to the tournament, Long Beach State lost in a friendly match at West Virginia. In the postseason, Long Beach State lost to Cal State Fullerton in the quarterfinals of the 2018 Big West Conference men's basketball tournament in Anaheim, California.

Within a few days of the elimination, Dan Monson accepted a five-year contract extension (through the 2022–23 school year) as a result of his past success at Long Beach State. Monson was rehired for multiple reasons, ranging from running the program primarily on sport ethics to his "on the court" results. To this season, Monson led the program to a Big West winning record each season since 2010–11 and participated in the NCAA tournament once.

Greg Floyd Jr. was a four-star recruit who turned down twenty-four other NCAA Division I schools for Long Beach State on September 7, 2016. Floyd was the highest rated incoming 49er since Jacob Thomas and Shelton Boykin, who were both a part of the recruiting class of 2010. On April 9, 2018, the Los Angeles Ballers announced that Floyd was ineligible [through the NCAA] to compete at Long Beach State due to scholastic probation at his former school. As a result, Floyd is currently an athlete for the Ballers, and the NCAA withdrew his commitment.

By July 17, 2018, Long Beach State redesigned the court by emphasizing on the color black, removing The Beach motto for the main athletics logo, and installing darker wood. However, some of the former features of the previous court design still remain in a different fashion, such as the social media hashtags #GoBeach and #LBNation.

Roster

Schedule

|-
!colspan=12 style=""| Non-conference regular season

|-
!colspan=12 style=""| Big West regular season

|-
!colspan=12 style=""| Big West tournament

References

Long Beach State
Long Beach State Beach men's basketball seasons
Long Beach State
Long Beach State